Chittanda  is a village in Thrissur district in the state of Kerala, India. The place is famous for the Karthyayani temple. The temple is one among the 108 Durga temples consecrated by lord Parashurama, the mythical founder of Kerala.

Demographics
 India census, Chittanda had a population of 6649 with 3157 males and 3492 females.

References

External links

 http://www.chittanda.com

Villages in Thrissur district